Water polo was contested by men's teams at the 2002 Asian Games in Busan, South Korea from September 30 to October 6, 2002. Six teams competed in two round robin groups. All games were staged at the Changwon Swimming Pool.

Schedule

Medalists

Draw
The teams were seeded based on their final ranking at the 1998 Asian Games.

Group A
 (Host)
 (3)

*

Group B
 (1)
 (2)*

*

* Withdrew.

Squads

Results
All times are Korea Standard Time (UTC+09:00)

Preliminary round

Group A

Group B

5th place match

Final round

Semifinals

Bronze medal match

Gold medal match

Final standing

References
 All Asian Games Results

External links
Official Website

 
2002 Asian Games events
Asian Games
2002
2002